Karetu is a community in the Northland Region of the North Island of New Zealand. Kawakawa is to the west, and Waikare is northeast. The Karetu River flows from the Russell Forest in the southeast through Karetu, and joins the Kawakawa River shortly before it flows into the Bay of Islands.

The name is a Māori word for Hierochloe redolens, a sweet-scented grass used in sachets and to make girdles.

Kāretu Marae and Ngāti Manu meeting house are affiliated with the Ngāpuhi hapū of Ngāti Manu and Te Uri Karaka. The local Pākaru-ki te Rangi site is also a traditional meeting ground of Ngāti Manu.

Demographics
The SA1 area is part of the larger Russell Forest-Rawhiti statistical area.

The SA1 statistical area had a population of 144 at the 2018 New Zealand census, unchanged since the 2013 census, and a decrease of 12 people (−7.7%) since the 2006 census. There were 54 households, comprising 66 males and 78 females, giving a sex ratio of 0.85 males per female. The median age was 52.4 years (compared with 37.4 years nationally), with 21 people (14.6%) aged under 15 years, 24 (16.7%) aged 15 to 29, 63 (43.8%) aged 30 to 64, and 39 (27.1%) aged 65 or older.

Ethnicities were 64.6% European/Pākehā, 43.8% Māori, 4.2% Pacific peoples, 2.1% Asian, and 2.1% other ethnicities. People may identify with more than one ethnicity.

Although some people chose not to answer the census's question about religious affiliation, 39.6% had no religion, 35.4% were Christian, 6.2% had Māori religious beliefs and 2.1% were Buddhist.

Of those at least 15 years old, 12 (9.8%) people had a bachelor's or higher degree, and 27 (22.0%) people had no formal qualifications. The median income was $21,900, compared with $31,800 nationally. 12 people (9.8%) earned over $70,000 compared to 17.2% nationally. The employment status of those at least 15 was that 51 (41.5%) people were employed full-time, 24 (19.5%) were part-time, and 0 (0.0%) were unemployed.

Education
Karetu School is a decile 3 coeducational primary school serving years 1–8. The school was established in 1886.

References

Far North District
Populated places in the Northland Region
Bay of Islands